Madhurmau Khurd, sometimes written as Marhar Mau Khurd, is a village in Gosainganj block of Lucknow district, Uttar Pradesh, India. As of 2011, its population is 2,012, in 372 households.

See also 
 Madhurmau Kalan

References 

Villages in Lucknow district